Green fleet refers to the combat specific vehicles of armed forces and company owned electric vehicles.

Canada

In Canada, the Green fleet refers to the vehicles which are capable of overseas operations, as well as militarized vehicles held by the Primary Reserve.

The Blue fleet refers to civilian vehicles held by the Department of National Defence and the Canadian Forces which may or may not be taken off-road.

United Kingdom

The term is used in the United Kingdom with reference to fleet management of the Ministry of Defence's vehicular assets. The term arises from the olive green colour of military vehicles for camouflage reasons, although green fleet vehicles could be of any colour (such as vehicles in desert camouflage or red RAF fire engines). Green fleet vehicles carry military registration numbers, unlike civilian registered white fleet vehicles.

Business-owned Green fleets

A Green fleet is created when a company provides electric vehicles to employees as an “employment” perk un-related to any need to drive for company purposes. The full annual mileage driven by these cars in a year can be aggregated to create a Green fleet  saving within the companies ESG statement and often moves a company a long way down the road of becoming carbon neutral.

Company cars as a “perk” of employment were taxed out of existence in the 1990s, but electric vehicles offered to employees under salary sacrifice schemes, which deliver combined savings of over 50% compared to a personal lease, make EV company cars the must-have recruitment and retention tool for businesses.

The company providing the EV can claim the 4.6 tons of  saving from switching from a petrol or diesel car, assuming an average 11,500 miles driven by the EV.

References

Military of Canada
Ministry of Defence (United Kingdom)